Michael Voss (born 7 July 1975) is a former professional Australian rules football player with the Brisbane Bears/Lions and current senior coach of the Carlton Football Club in the Australian Football League (AFL). 

Voss was a triple premiership captain with the Brisbane Football Club. He was also the first Brisbane player to win the Brownlow Medal (1996), which is considered the game's most prestigious individual award; won the Leigh Matthews Trophy twice (2002 and 2003), which is awarded annually to the league's most valued player; and has been inducted into the Australian Football Hall of Fame. Additionally, he represented Australia in the 2006 International Rules Series. As a player, he was noted for his fearless play, inspirational leadership, and the ability to turn a game.

Early life
Voss was born in Traralgon, Victoria and lived as a child in Orbost until the age of 11, when he moved with his family to Beenleigh in Logan, Queensland. Voss attended Trinity College during his high-school years in Queensland. His younger brother Brett also played for the Brisbane Lions before transferring to St Kilda Football Club to enhance his opportunities to play senior football.

Voss's football skills were excellent from an early age. He made his senior debut for Morningside in the QAFL at the age of 15 years. A year later, he kicked 14 goals for Queensland in a second-division under-17 representative match, going on to win the inaugural Hunter Harrison Medal for the tournament.

Voss grew up supporting the Carlton Football Club.

Playing career

Brisbane Bears

Rise to stardom
At 17 years and 11 days of age in 1992, he debuted for the Brisbane Bears against Fitzroy at Princes Park in Melbourne in Round 18, 1992,  the youngest-ever player to play a senior game for the club.

Although highly skilled, he was also slight, but he worked to get the most out of his body. By 1996, he was one of the most accomplished players in the competition, and at the end of the season he shared the Brownlow Medal, the game's highest individual honour, with James Hird.

Brisbane Lions
At the end of 1996, following the merger of the Fitzroy Football Club and the Brisbane Bears, Voss and teammate Alastair Lynch were named as inaugural co-captains of the newly formed Brisbane Lions. In 2019, Kobe Howard described Voss as "one of the game's greatest players" in Australian football history.

In 1998, Voss suffered a catastrophic injury while contesting a mark at Subiaco Oval in Perth in a match against Fremantle. He collided with Fremantle's Shane Parker and broke his lower leg in half.  The subsequent operation was at Sir Charles Gairdner Hospital, and it was a year before he was fit and in training to play again. This injury, along with the destabilisation caused by the merger of Fitzroy and the Bears, was a key factor in the Brisbane Lions finishing 16th (last) with a record of 5 wins, 16 losses, and 1 draw.

Premiership and captaincy success
Voss captained the Brisbane Lions in four consecutive AFL Grand Finals, yielding three premierships (2001–2003).  His performance in the 2002 Grand Final against Collingwood was an outstanding example of courage, skill and leadership, only narrowly conceding the Norm Smith Medal to opposing captain and former Bears teammate Nathan Buckley.

Later career
In early 2004, Voss kicked a career-best seven goals against a struggling Adelaide at AAMI Stadium as coach Leigh Matthews looked to play him in the forward line during the latter part of his career. However, a heavy injury toll to the Lions meant that Voss continued his career in the midfield.

In 2005, Voss suffered a badly cut calf before Round 2 while renovating his home. He recovered to play his 250th game the following week, but the Lions suffered an embarrassing six-point loss to eventual premiers  after they had led by 32 points at the final change. Prior to this, Voss had suffered from tendinitis of the knee but had been able to curtail the problem. The calf injury affected his performances, with the four games after the injury yielding a high possession count of only 16. Voss later improved, and in Round 21 picked up 35 possessions against Port Adelaide.

Soon after the completion of the 2006 season, Voss announced his retirement from his playing career after 289 games and 15 years at the Brisbane Bears and Lions with three premierships and a Brownlow Medal to his name. He was subsequently employed as a sports journalist by Channel 10 in Brisbane. Voss said farewell in what turned out to be his last game, at the Gabba in Round 22 against St Kilda, gathering 34 possessions and two Brownlow Medal votes as a struggling Brisbane Lions team went down by 50 points to finals-bound St Kilda, who won on Brisbane's turf for the first time in a decade. Despite losing badly, the Lions received a long-standing ovation from a sold-out home crowd after the game for their prior premiership efforts as well as general farewell to several other players.

Coaching career
When announcing his retirement at the end of Brisbane's 2006 season, there was speculation that Voss would soon become a senior coach or join Leigh Matthews in the Brisbane Lions coaching team. Voss instead joined the Channel 10 sports commentary team.

Voss coached Australia's AIS Under-17 squad to victory against the South African national Australian rules football team at North West Cricket Stadium in Potchefstroom, South Africa.

Voss was often mentioned as a candidate to coach the Melbourne Demons after the resignation of Neale Daniher. He was also linked to various other coaching positions, most notably Carlton.

Voss was seen by many to be the likely inaugural coach of the Gold Coast side, but he instead signed a two-year deal with the West Coast Eagles as an assistant coach and formally pulled himself out of the Gold Coast bid.

Brisbane Lions senior coach (2009–2013)

When Leigh Matthews, senior coach of the Brisbane Lions, resigned at the end of their 2008 season, Eagles' chief executive Trevor Nisbett gave Voss permission to talk with his former club. The Lions later announced Voss as their new senior coach until the end of 2011.

Voss made his coaching debut in Brisbane's defeat of the West Coast Eagles in Round 1, 2009.

In Voss's first season as senior coach of the Brisbane Lions in the 2009 season, he guided the Brisbane Lions into their first finals campaign since 2004, including a comeback elimination final victory over Carlton after trailing by 30 points early in the fourth quarter. However, the Lions under Voss were eliminated in the semi-finals by the Western Bulldogs.

His next two years were not as successful on-field. After the club won its first four matches to be sitting on top of the ladder early in the 2010 season, the Lions under Voss would only win three more games, finishing 13th (out of 16) on the ladder. The Lions' 2011 Season was even worse, with the Lions under Voss finishing 15th (out of 17 teams), its worst placing since 1998 when it won the wooden spoon. This continued in the 2012 season, when the Lions under Voss finished 13th on the ladder. The Lions with Voss kept struggling in the 2013 season, where the Lions sat 12th on the ladder with eight wins and eleven losses after Round 19, 2013. 

On 13 August 2013, Voss was told that he would not be receiving a contract extension with the Lions for 2014. Voss then opted not to coach out his contract, which expired at the end of the 2013 season. Voss was then replaced by assistant coach Mark Harvey as caretaker senior coach of the Brisbane Lions for the remainder of the 2013 season. Justin Leppitsch was eventually appointed as the new senior coach of the Lions from 2014 onwards.

Voss left the club having coached 109 games for the Lions, achieving 43 wins, 65 losses, and 1 draw, for a winning percentage of 39.91%.

Port Adelaide Football Club assistant coach (2015–2021)

In October 2014, Voss joined the Port Adelaide Football Club as an assistant coach under senior coach Ken Hinkley in the position of midfield manager, replacing Phil Walsh, who had joined the Adelaide Football Club. One measure of his success at Port is the number of their midfielders selected for the All-Australian team Robbie Gray (2014, 2017, 2018) Chad Wingard (2015), Travis Boak (2020), Charlie Dixon (2020), and 2021 Brownlow medallist Ollie Wines (2021). Voss left the Port Adelaide Football club at the end of the 2021 season.

Carlton Football Club senior coach (2022–)
In September 2021, following seven years as an assistant with the Power, Voss officially returned to the AFL's senior coaching ranks after being appointed senior coach of the Carlton Football Club.  Voss replaced David Teague as Carlton's senior coach, after Teague was sacked at the end of the 2021 season.  Carlton Football Club President Luke Sayers on the appointment of Voss as senior coach said in a statement: "After a thorough and considered selection process, Voss's credentials and vast experience in football made him the right person for the job."

In the 2022 season, Voss took a leave of absence for one game in Round 2, 2022, against the Western Bulldogs after he tested positive for COVID-19. Assistant coach Ashley Hansen filled in as caretaker interim senior coach in the absence of Voss, and Carlton won the game by 12 points. Voss resumed his role as senior coach in Round 3, 2022, against Hawthorn, where Carlton won by a point. Carlton under Voss in his first year as senior coach, finished ninth with twelve wins and ten losses, just missing out of the finals, at the end of the 2022 season.

Statistics

Playing statistics

|-
|- style="background-color: #EAEAEA"
! scope="row" style="text-align:center" | 1992
|style="text-align:center;"|
| 56 || 6 || 2 || 2 || 61 || 58 || 119 || 22 || 11 || 0.3 || 0.3 || 10.2 || 9.7 || 19.8 || 3.7 || 1.8 || 0
|-
! scope="row" style="text-align:center" | 1993
|style="text-align:center;"|
| 3 || 16 || 7 || 1 || 141 || 116 || 257 || 65 || 22 || 0.4 || 0.1 || 8.8 || 7.3 || 16.1 || 4.1 || 1.4 || 1
|- style="background-color: #EAEAEA"
! scope="row" style="text-align:center" | 1994
|style="text-align:center;"|
| 3 || 12 || 10 || 2 || 105 || 63 || 168 || 34 || 13 || 0.8 || 0.2 || 8.8 || 5.3 || 14.0 || 2.8 || 1.1 || 0
|-
! scope="row" style="text-align:center" | 1995
|style="text-align:center;"|
| 3 || 21 || 30 || 15 || 285 || 207 || 492 || 88 || 30 || 1.4 || 0.7 || 13.6 || 9.9 || 23.4 || 4.2 || 1.4 || 13
|- style="background-color: #EAEAEA"
! scope="row" style="text-align:center" | 1996
|style="text-align:center;"|
| 3 || 24 || 23 || 12 || 336 || 236 || 572 || 87 || 55 || 1.0 || 0.5 || 14.0 || 9.8 || 23.8 || 3.6 || 2.3 || bgcolor="98FB98" | 21
|-
! scope="row" style="text-align:center" | 1997
|style="text-align:center;"|
| 3 || 17 || 9 || 12 || 185 || 152 || 337 || 40 || 21 || 0.5 || 0.7 || 10.9 || 8.9 || 19.8 || 2.4 || 1.2 || 4
|- style="background-color: #EAEAEA"
! scope="row" style="text-align:center" | 1998
|style="text-align:center;"|
| 3 || 11 || 4 || 5 || 117 || 122 || 239 || 31 || 22 || 0.4 || 0.5 || 10.6 || 11.1 || 21.7 || 2.8 || 2.0 || 7
|-
! scope="row" style="text-align:center" | 1999
|style="text-align:center;"|
| 3 || 21 || 23 || 13 || 248 || 145 || 393 || 63 || 34 || 1.1 || 0.6 || 11.8 || 6.9 || 18.7 || 3.0 || 1.6 || 10
|- style="background-color: #EAEAEA"
! scope="row" style="text-align:center" | 2000
|style="text-align:center;"|
| 3 || 23 || 14 || 16 || 318 || 232 || 550 || 103 || 64 || 0.6 || 0.7 || 13.8 || 10.1 || 23.9 || 4.5 || 2.8 || 16
|-
| scope="row" bgcolor="F0E68C" | 2001#
|style="text-align:center;"|
| 3 ||25 || 21 || 19 || 363 || 240 || 603 || 98 || 67 || 0.8 || 0.8 || 14.5 || 9.6 || 24.1 || 3.9 || 2.7 || 19
|- style="background-color: #EAEAEA"
| scope="row" bgcolor="F0E68C" | 2002#
|style="text-align:center;"|
| 3 || 22 || 36 || 21 || 283 || 184 || 467 || 88 || 47 || 1.6 || 1.0 || 12.9 || 8.4 || 21.2 || 4.0 || 2.1 || 17
|-
| scope="row" bgcolor="F0E68C" | 2003#
|style="text-align:center;"|
| 3 || 25 || 20 || 17 || 283 || 252 || 535 || 105 || 66 || 0.8 || 0.7 || 11.3 || 10.1 || 21.4 || 4.2 || 2.6 || 19
|- style="background-color: #EAEAEA"
! scope="row" style="text-align:center" | 2004
|style="text-align:center;"|
| 3 || 24 || 31 || 17 || 276 || 231 || 507 || 97 || 58 || 1.3 || 0.7 || 11.5 || 9.6 || 21.1 || 4.0 || 2.4 || 10
|-
! scope="row" style="text-align:center" | 2005
|style="text-align:center;"|
| 3 || 21 || 12 || 4 || 241 || 201 || 442 || 92 || 49 || 0.6 || 0.2 || 11.5 || 9.6 || 21.0 || 4.4 || 2.3 || 6
|- style="background-color: #EAEAEA"
! scope="row" style="text-align:center" | 2006
|style="text-align:center;"|
| 3 || 21 || 3 || 5 || 232 || 230 || 462 || 104 || 54 || 0.1 || 0.2 || 11.0 || 11.0 || 22.0 || 5.0 || 2.6 || 7
|- class="sortbottom"
! colspan=3| Career
! 289
! 245
! 161
! 3474
! 2669
! 6143
! 1117
! 613
! 0.8
! 0.6
! 12.0
! 9.2
! 21.3
! 3.9
! 2.1
! 150
|}

Coaching statistics
Statistics are correct to the end of round 23, 2022

|- style="background-color: #EAEAEA"
! scope="row" style="text-align:center; font-weight:normal" | 2009
|style="text-align:center;"|
| 24 || 14 || 9 || 1 || 60.4% || 6 || 16
|-
! scope="row" style="text-align:center; font-weight:normal" | 2010
|style="text-align:center;"|
| 22 || 7 || 15 || 0 || 31.8% || 13 || 16
|- style="background-color: #EAEAEA"
! scope="row" style="text-align:center; font-weight:normal" | 2011
|style="text-align:center;"|
| 22 || 4 || 18 || 0 || 18.2% || 15 || 17
|-
! scope="row" style="text-align:center; font-weight:normal" | 2012
|style="text-align:center;"|
| 22 || 10 || 12 || 0 || 45.5% || 13 || 18
|- style="background-color: #EAEAEA"
! scope="row" style="text-align:center; font-weight:normal" | 2013
|style="text-align:center;"|
| 19 || 8 || 11 || 0 || 42.1% || 12 || 18
|-
! scope="row" style="text-align:center; font-weight:normal" | 2022
|style="text-align:center;"|
| 22 || 12 || 10 || 0 || 52.4% || 9 || 18
|- class="sortbottom"
! colspan=2| Career totals
! 130
! 54
! 75
! 1
! 41.9%
! colspan=2|
|}

Honours and achievements

Team:
AFL Premiership (Brisbane Lions): 2001 (C), 2002 (C), 2003 (C)
Individual:
Brownlow Medal: 1996 (tied with James Hird)
Brisbane Bears Club Champion Award: 1995, 1996
Merrett-Murray Medal (Brisbane Lions): 2000, 2001, 2003
Brisbane Lions Captain: 1997–2006
All-Australian: 1996, 1999, 2001, 2002 (C), 2003 (C)
AFLPA Most Valuable Player Award (Leigh Matthews Trophy): 2002, 2003
AFLPA Best Captain Award: 2001, 2002 2003, 2004
AFLPA Robert Rose Most Courageous Player Award: 2001
Herald Sun Player of the Year Award: 2003
Lou Richards Medal: 2001
Australian Football Media Association Player of the Year Award: 2001

Post-playing career
Voss joined the Network Ten AFL commentary team in 2007 in a special comments role. He was also appointed the role of sports anchor on 10 News First Queensland.

In 2011, Voss was inducted into the Australian Football Hall of Fame.

Controversy 
In 2007, Voss was charged for his role in a melee with Simon Black, Fraser Gehrig and three other high-profile AFL players at a Melbourne nightclub. At the resulting trial, Voss agreed to enter a diversion program and therefore no conviction was recorded.

References

External links

Michael Voss at the Brisbane Lions website 

10 News First presenters
1975 births
Living people
All-Australians (AFL)
Brisbane Bears players
Brisbane Lions players
Brisbane Lions Premiership players
Brownlow Medal winners
Leigh Matthews Trophy winners
Brisbane Bears Club Champion winners
Brisbane Lions captains
Brisbane Lions coaches
Australian people of German descent
Merrett–Murray Medal winners
Morningside Australian Football Club players
People from Orbost
People from Traralgon
Sportspeople from Logan, Queensland
Australian rules footballers from Victoria (Australia)
Australian rules footballers from Queensland
Australian Football Hall of Fame inductees
Australia international rules football team players
Three-time VFL/AFL Premiership players